Kiko is the sixth album by the Mexican American rock group Los Lobos.  A year later, Los Lobos performed a spoof of their song "Kiko and the Lavender Moon" known as "Elmo and the Lavender Moon" on the PBS series Sesame Street. With the exception of "La Bamba"'s 2 million units sold, "Kiko" sold more units (vinyl, CDs, cassettes) than any other album in their 46 year career of their original songs. Roughly 450,000 units were sold worldwide.

Track listing
All songs written by David Hidalgo and Louie Pérez except where noted.
"Dream In Blue"  – 3:34
"Wake Up Dolores"  – 2:55
"Angels with Dirty Faces"  – 4:02
"That Train Don't Stop Here" (Cesar Rosas, Leroy Preston) – 3:52
"Kiko and the Lavender Moon"  – 3:35
"Saint Behind The Glass"  – 3:17
"Reva's House"  – 3:04
"When the Circus Comes"  – 3:16
"Arizona Skies"  – 2:45
"Short Side of Nothing"  – 2:57
"Two Janes"  – 3:53
"Wicked Rain" (Cesar Rosas) – 3:04
"Whiskey Trail" – 2:41
"Just a Man" – 3:40
"Peace" – 3:55
"Rio de Tenampa" – 1:59

Personnel 
 Steve Berlin - tenor, baritone, and soprano sax, flute, melodica, harmonica, organ, piano, synthesizer, percussion
 David Hidalgo - guitars, accordion, violin, banjo, piano, percussion, vocals
 Conrad Lozano - Fender 5-string jazz bass and 4-string precision bass, Godin fretless bass, guitarron, background vocals
 Louie Pérez - drums, vocals, guitars, percussion
 Cesar Rosas - electric and acoustic guitars, vocals
 Pete Thomas - drums
 Victor Bisetti - drums (15, 16), percussion
 Fermin Herrera - Veracruz harp (6)
 Alex Acuña - percussion
 Gary Mallaber - drums (2)
 Mitchell Froom and his House of Keyboards La Chilapeña brass band

Billboard charts

20th Anniversary Edition

In August 2012 Shout! Factory released a 20th Anniversary Edition of the album complete with 5 bonus tracks. Along with the re-issue, a full length concert recorded in 2006 at the House of Blues, San Diego titled Kiko Live was released on DVD, Blu-ray, and CD.

References

External links
"Kiko And The Lavender Moon" video on YouTube

Los Lobos albums
1992 albums
Albums produced by Mitchell Froom
Slash Records albums
Art rock albums by American artists